The Northwest Suburban Conference is an athletic conference for all northwest suburban high schools of Minneapolis, Minnesota.

Member schools by district
Anoka-Hennepin School District 11
Andover High School — Andover
Anoka High School — Anoka
Blaine High School — Blaine
Champlin Park High School — Champlin
Coon Rapids High School — Coon Rapids
Centennial School District 12
Centennial High School — Circle Pines
Elk River Area School District 728
Elk River High School — Elk River
Rogers High School — Rogers (2019)
Osseo School District 279
Maple Grove Senior High School — Maple Grove
Osseo Senior High School — Osseo 
Park Center Senior High School — Brooklyn Park 
Robbinsdale School District 281
Robbinsdale Armstrong High School — Plymouth, MN (2010)
Spring Lake Park School District 16
Spring Lake Park High School— Spring Lake Park
Totino Grace
Totino-Grace High School— Fridley

External links
Northwest Suburban Conference website

Minnesota high school sports conferences